The Genius of Fascism is a statue from 1939 by the Italian sculptor Italo Griselli. It is located outside the Palazzo degli Uffici in the EUR district of Rome, Italy. In 1952, the supervisor of the district, Virgilio Testa, renamed the statue the "Genius of Sport." Boxing hand wraps were then added to the hands of the figure.

References 

Italian art
Arts in Italy